Cameron Shainaan Tom (born June 21, 1995) is an American football center for the Philadelphia Eagles of the National Football League (NFL). He played college football at Southern Miss and signed with the New Orleans Saints as an undrafted free agent in 2017.

Early years
Tom attended and played high school football at Catholic High School. He played offensive guard for the Bears.

College career
Tom attended and played college football at Southern Miss from 2013–2016 under head coaches Todd Monken and Jay Hopson. As a freshman, he started nine games. He made his debut in the season opener against Texas State and earned his first start against Boise State. As a sophomore, he started all 12 games. As a junior, he started all 14 games at the center position.

Professional career

New Orleans Saints
Tom signed with the New Orleans Saints as an undrafted free agent on May 1, 2017. He was waived on September 2, 2017, and was signed to the Saints' practice squad the next day. He was promoted to the active roster on October 25, 2017. He made his NFL debut in Week 3 of the 2018 season against the Atlanta Falcons.

On August 31, 2019, Tom was placed on injured reserve.

On April 8, 2020, Tom re-signed with the Saints. He was waived on September 5, 2020, and signed to the practice squad the next day. He was elevated to the active roster on November 29 for the team's week 12 game against the Denver Broncos, and reverted to the practice squad after the game. He was elevated again on January 16, 2021, for the team's divisional playoff game against the Tampa Bay Buccaneers, and reverted to the practice squad again following the game. His practice squad contract with the team expired after the season on January 25, 2021.

Miami Dolphins
On February 3, 2021, Tom signed a reserve/futures contract with the Miami Dolphins. He was waived on August 31, 2021 and re-signed to the practice squad the next day. He was promoted to the active roster on November 10, 2021. He was waived on December 4 and re-signed to the practice squad. He was promoted to the active roster on December 24, 2021.

Philadelphia Eagles
Tom was signed by the Philadelphia Eagles on July 27, . He was waived on August 30, 2022 and signed to the practice squad the next day.

References

External links
Twitter
New Orleans Saints bio
Southern Miss Golden Eagles bio

1995 births
Living people
American football centers
Catholic High School (Baton Rouge, Louisiana) alumni
Miami Dolphins players
New Orleans Saints players
Players of American football from Baton Rouge, Louisiana
Southern Miss Golden Eagles football players
Philadelphia Eagles players